Why I Would Not Marry? is a lost 1918 silent film drama directed by Richard Stanton and starring Lucy Fox. It was produced and distributed by William Fox.

Cast
Lucy Fox - Adele Moore
Edward Sedgwick - ?unknown role
William B. Davidson - unknown role

References

External links
 Why I Would Not Marry? at IMDb.com

1918 films
American silent feature films
Lost American films
Fox Film films
American black-and-white films
Silent American drama films
1918 drama films
1918 lost films
Lost drama films
1910s American films